Parvioris is a genus of small ectoparasitic sea snails, marine gastropod mollusks in the family Eulimidae.

Species
Species within the genus Parvioris:

 Parvioris astropectenicola (Kuroda & Habe, 1950)
 Parvioris australiensis Warén, 1981
 Parvioris blakeae Warén, 1981
 Parvioris brevis (G. B. Sowerby I, 1834)
 Parvioris carneola (Gould, 1861)
 Parvioris dilecta (E. A. Smith, 1899)
 Parvioris equestris (Koehler & Vaney, 1912)
 Parvioris fulvescens (A. Adams, 1866)
 Parvioris ibizenca (Nordsieck, 1968)
 Parvioris imitatrix (Boettger, 1893)
 Parvioris inflexa (Pease, 1867)
 Parvioris innocens (Thiele, 1925)
 Parvioris mortoni Warén, 1981
 Parvioris natalensis (E. A. Smith, 1899)
 Parvioris nitens (Brazier, 1876)
 Parvioris noumeae Warén, 1981
 Parvioris shoplandi (Melvill, 1898)
 Parvioris sowerbyi (Barnard, 1963)
 Parvioris styliferoides (Melvill & Standen, 1901)
 Parvioris subobtusa (Laseron, 1955)
Species brought into synonymy
 Parvioris anderswareni van Aartsen & Giannuzzi-Savelli, 1991 : synonym of Parvioris ibizenca (Nordsieck, 1968)
 Parvioris brevicula (Dunker MS, Tryon, 1886): synonym of Oceanida mindoroensis (Adams & Reeve, 1850)
 Parvioris bryani (Pilsbry, 1918) : synonym of Melanella bryani Pilsbry, 1918
 Parvioris caledonica (Morlet, 1881) : synonym of Parvioris fulvescens (A. Adams, 1866)
 Parvioris lata (Laseron, 1955) : synonym of Parvioris subobtusa (Laseron, 1955)
 Parvioris mabutii (Nomura & Hatai, 1935) : synonym of Parvioris fulvescens (A. Adams, 1866)
 Parvioris microstoma (Brusina, 1869) : synonym of Parvioris ibizenca (Nordsieck, 1968)
 Parvioris nana (Monterosato, 1878) : synonym of Nanobalcis nana (Monterosato, 1878)
 Parvioris saccata (Boettger, 1893) : synonym of Parvioris inflexa (Pease, 1867)
 Parvioris submarginata (Sowerby, 1901) : synonym of Parvioris imitatrix (Boettger, 1893)

References

 Warén A. (1981) Revision of the genera Apicalia A. Adams and Stilapex Iredale and description of two new genera (Mollusca, Prosobranchia, Eulimidae). Zoologica Scripta 10: 133-154.

External links
 To World Register of Marine Species

Eulimidae